Money No Enough 2 is a Singaporean comedy film written and directed by Jack Neo and produced by Neo Studios, Mediacorp Raintree Pictures and Scorpio East Pictures. It is a sequel to the 1998's film Money No Enough, which was directed by Tay Teck Lock and written by Jack Neo, which also stars Neo, Mark Lee and Henry Thia. The movie sees Neo, Lee and Thia reprising their roles from the first film where they portrayed three best friends who started a car polishing business together, and as three brothers in this film who live their lives together with their family and having different plans on taking care of their elderly mother (Lai Meng).

Plot
The three brothers of the mother of Yang were having a hot pot after caught in a traffic jam on separate locations. While stuck in the traffic, Bao Huang and Bao Qiang were separately criticising on the Electronic Road Pricing gantries. Bao Hui was curious on the Caring Pollen supplement which Bao Huang took and how he make profits, and mentioned Bao Qiang's estate agent helped him earned over millions; Bao Qiang wife, Lingling, however, warned about the risks on making a large investment and handling on losses if unsuccessful.

The next day, after being awarded shopping vouchers and a reflexology package after working as an employer for 30 years, Hui attends a conference hosted by Huang and commemorate one of his manager, Chen Guan Sai, for making profits. Shortly after, Huang offers the job to Hui, after which Yang gives Hui $10,000 of her life savings from a tin of Cream crackers, to which Hui promises to return when he has enough. Qiang's daughter, Stella, took part in the audition for a singing competition and was introduced by the daughter of Qiang's employee. Concerned that her size would lose the competition, he then bribed other auditionees by giving money, but is caught and forced out by the organizer.

Yang is later diagnosed of a history of diabetes and her body having fat lumps, which explains why Yang felt tired often. Yanyan, Huang's wife, asks to arrange the doctor for a scan, but Huang opposes it due to time constraints. After a few days of work, Hui becomes a manager, purchases a panel van, and repays the money to Yang. Thereafter, he and his family purchases other luxuries such as a MioTV pay television and a ticket to the Singapore Grand Prix.

Huang is caught in a police for speeding in Pan Island Expressway; the blame is then placed on Yang and afterwards, Yanyan covers up by telling she was the driver and was escorted to the police station; this and Huang visiting a nightclub strains their marriage. Shortly after, they are prosecuted, while Hui fails to sue the carpark management after they were issued a summon; a situation worsened by a language barrier and is possibly charged for contempt. Later, while Hui took his friends for a lunch and promoting the supplement, he sees a news broadcast that about tens of patients who were admitted to hospital showed signs of poisoning due to the supplements. After trying to claim that these were imitations, Hui called Huang to sought help but was taken by the mob somewhere to watch a viral YouTube video uploaded by Chen on promoting the supplements. An infuriated Huang called Chen to explain the matter, to which Chen reveals that he borrowed $80,000 from a loan shark to initiate a business, and now demands $100,000, with a $20,000 increase due to interests.

Dumbfounded on what to do with the remaining batches of supplements, Hui and Huang are then confronted by a few disgruntled employees; Huang told the employers to trust them and wait for the laboratory results to be released. Soon after, Huang calls Hui's friend, Mindy, for an invite; it was later revealed to be a trap set by Chen, and offered Huang to swallow a bowl of supplements as proof, but ended up in a scrawl and beaten up by Chen's henchman, before he dismisses Huang by demanding a $100,000 payment as soon as possible. Meanwhile, Qiang lodged a police report when the lawyer representative took the money from the client, but not before they received another phone call informing that their en-bloc sales failed after their committees have rejected his project proposal. To no avail, they failed to pay their mortgage loan for the bungalow and wind up settling at a house flat instead, much to Stella's chagrin.

At a coffee shop, the three brothers discuss their next course of action to try to rack up money; however their efforts was to no success. After meeting up again, the brothers saw Hui got a sum of money, which they realize was actually retrieved from Yang because of the scent of the crackers. After giving her entire life savings to the brothers, she was depressed but upon her friends' encouragements, acts as a beggar, but is caught and taken to custody. After the brothers learned on her misdeed and took her home, Yang suddenly collapses and was warded to a hospital. A doctor informed that Yang was still recuperating in a hospital and was discharged the day after.

Pressured by Chen's debt, Yanyan gave a $100,000 cheque to Huang to repay the debts, while he and Hui were able to dispose the supplement stocks safely. However, they are visited by the officers of Corrupt Practices Investigation Bureau, who ask to bring Yanyan for investigation. Huang initially denies Yanyan of any wrongdoing, after which Yanyan reveals that the $100,000 cheque was not from her father as mentioned earlier, but actually from company's funds. As she is then arrested, Huang lashes out at her. Yanyan is eventually jailed for a year for embezzlement, while Huang is found guilty of food poisoning and ordered to pay a fine.

Shortly after the arrest, Huang and Hui began their fresh jobs as a taxi driver and a cleaner respectively, while Qiang continued his en-bloc sales, happily settling their new lives. Qiang was able to rack up at least $300,000 for the sales, and some more money for Ling and Stella's involvement in a getai concert as Ghost Festival was underway.

Soon after, Yang began to urinate whenever she goes, raising concerns to the brothers on deciding who to be the caretaker for the week. The brothers decide to take turns for caring for their mother for a week, during which they face problems (Yang's short-term memory leads to confusion on where she placed her bra and if she knew Hui had eaten, to Huang and Hui's chagrin, while Qiang had difficulty trying to find where she would sleep). Afterwards, the brothers decided to let Hui bring Yang to a retirement home. There, she collapses in shock, after seeing Hui run away and then back to his mother's side, before she is warded to the hospital's intensive care unit. Hui then admonishes Huang and Qiang for the idea, before they get concerned about the hospital expenses. The trio negotiated with the hospital's management to downsize the class, but the current condition and the risks involved lead to the management denying their request.

The brothers then received a talisman to burn in-front of Yang, so she would pass on quickly. Hui then burns the paper, but a frightened Qiang stops it midway, unable to bear the loss of Yang. Coincidentally, the monitor bleeps and the nurse asks them and Xiuyun to wait outside. Meanwhile, Lingling, Stella and the singers are involved in a car accident - leading to them sustaining minor injuries and putting Stella in critical condition.

With the accident, both Yang and Stella need blood to undergo surgery: both patients share the same blood type of O-; only two O- blood bags are left, one that has been given to a patient, and getting a new supply of bags would take time. While Qiang and Lingling share the same blood type and were eligible to donate blood, they could not due to separate reasons (Qiang's poor liver, and Lingling's anemia). Qiang then figures out that the one who got one blood bag was Yang, after which Qiang and Lingling quarrel with Huang and Hui over who to save, and Lingling racing to Yang's ward to snatch a box of blood bags, leading to a fight between them. Yang, who overheard the argument, cries and pulls the life support to end her life, to everyone's shock, and is pronounced dead soon after.

Seven weeks following Yang's funeral, the family visited for another pot dinner while praying Yang to repent for their misdeeds and telling that they have learned a lesson on money, while thanking her for winning the first prize in a 4D lottery as forgiveness, with the winning number based on the registration number of the van which used for the transport of her coffin. The family, including Yanyan, who is released, all thank her for her guidance, while Stella thanks Yang for making the sacrifice. While eating, Huang introduces a safely-tested Supifen bark powder supplement, which becomes the key to their financial recovery later on.

During the credits, Huang met his friends and discussing on the parking coupons.

Mini-sequel

Following the events of Money No Enough 2, the brothers paid a visit to Yang during the Ghost Festival and began complaining about their poor finance performances and accusing that she was not assisting them supernaturally, before being haunted by her in multiple occasions.

Cast
The main characters of the movie were played by the following actors:
Henry Thia as Yang BaohuiThe eldest brother of the Yang family who was a dedicated company worker for 30 years before working as a company introduced by Baohuang. Sometimes smart but also quirky solving issues. The last name Hui was based on the last name of Thia.
Mark Lee as Yang BaohuangThe youngest brother of the Yang family who is a company manager. Huang was arrogant and sleazy but care among the brothers the most, and an experienced driver. The last name Huang was based on the last name of Lee.
Jack Neo as Yang BaoqiangThe second brother of the Yang family who owns a luxurious BMW X3 and a bungalow, due to the large profits that he got from the resulting sales as an estate agent. Qiang was quick and decisive on solving questions especially handling money problems, notably after the time when he lives in a HDB flat. The last name Qiang was based on the last name of Neo.
Lai Meng as Mother YangThe mother of the three brothers of Yang, who she have a record of diabetes and began displaying signs and symptoms throughout the course of the film. Yang was also much kindred to the three brothers on the actions and remain loyal. 
Anna Lin Ruping as Lin XiuyunThe wife of eldest brother Baohui, who sometimes care the most for Baohui and has three daughters.
Vivian Lai as Zhou YanyanThe wife of youngest brother Baohuang and the caregiver of the house. Yanyan was also sometimes protective and truthful to Baohuang but their relationship find it hard to get a firm ground. 
Choo Lingling as Zhang LinglingThe wife of second brother Baoqiang, who she was also a spendthrift but conservative, providing keen advices to Baoqiang whenever he need. 
Natalli Ong Ai Wen as Stella YangThe only daughter of Baoqiang who she was a passionate singer. She likes to live in a lap of luxury and dislikes adapting in a normal life once they settled in a HDB flat.
John Cheng as Chen Guan SaiAn employee worked under Baohuang and a former loan shark.

Additional cameos include then-Member of Parliament Michael Palmer, and future MP David Ong who appeared in a scene serving as members-of-parliament for Yang Baoqiang. Other actors also appearing the film include Wang Lei, Michelle Choo and Huang Bihua as singers in a Getai scene, and CK Cheong in another scene.

Sequel
In April 2020, an online live session between Jack Neo and Mark Lee hinted the possible sequel for the Money No Enough 2 and are currently writing the script for the upcoming sequel Money No Enough 3. The filming was initially planned to begin in September 2020, but was delayed due to the COVID-19 pandemic in Singapore. Jack stated that the film concept in the third film series will be a departure from the previous films as he implied that the people’s perception to the money and the concept of the money has been changed.

References

External links
Official site

Singaporean comedy films
Films directed by Jack Neo
Singaporean sequel films